Ceptura is a commune in Prahova County, Muntenia, Romania. It is composed of five villages: Ceptura de Jos (the commune centre), Ceptura de Sus, Malu Roșu, Rotari, and Șoimești.

The open-pit Ceptura Coal Mine (opened in 1954) is located in Ceptura de Sus.

Notable people
George Dorul Dumitrescu (1901 or 1904–1985), prose writer and columnist
Georgeta Militaru-Mașca (born 1954), rower

Gallery

References

Ceptura
Localities in Muntenia